Lugbara may refer to:
Lugbara people
Lugbara language